Kent Olsson may refer to:

 Kent Olsson (politician) (born 1944), Swedish politician of the Moderate Party
 Kent Olsson (orienteer) (born 1958), Swedish orienteering competitor